Octavius Ryland (c. 24 June 1800 – 8 May 1886) was a convict transported to Western Australia, who later became one of the colony's ex-convict school teachers.

Born in London in 1800 and baptised on 24 June of that year, Octavius Ryland was the eight son of Richard Ryland and Harriet Croft, daughter of Sir Archer Croft, baronet. Ryland married Mary Ann Muggeridge on 27 September 1826. By 1850, he was widowed with two children, and working either as a corn or coin dealer; these are alternative transcriptions of the handwritten records. That year, he was tried at the Old Bailey for extortion, and on 10 June was sentenced to 15 years' penal servitude. He spent two years at the Newgate Jail, including nine months of solitary confinement. He was then transported to Western Australia, arriving at Fremantle on board the William Jardine on 1 August 1852. He gained his ticket of leave on 4 October 1854, and received a conditional pardon on 21 January 1860. He then became a schoolteacher, teaching at Upper Swan in 1864, then Upper (South) Greenough until 1869. After a short stint in Dongara, he taught at Serpentine from 1870 to 1880, and again in 1884. He was also postmaster of the district from 1870 to 1885. Erickson (1983) writes "he had a reputation of being a bitter man, harsh with his pupils". He spent the final years of his life at the Mount Eliza Depot, a home for "old or incapable paupers", dying there on 8 May 1886.

References

 
 

1800 births
1886 deaths
Convicts transported to Western Australia
Australian schoolteachers